Mount Valley Township is a township in Winnebago County, Iowa, in the USA.

History
Mount Valley Township was founded in 1879. It was likely named from the mounds and valleys covering its uneven terrain.

References

Townships in Winnebago County, Iowa
Townships in Iowa